Chahar Farizeh Rural District is a rural district (dehestan) in the Central District of Bandar-e Anzali County, Gilan Province, Iran. At the 2006 census, its population was 13,829, in 4,237 families. The rural district has 21 villages.

References 

Rural Districts of Gilan Province
Bandar-e Anzali County